Zoran Lesjak (born 19 May 1988) is a Croatian footballer who plays for Hungarian top flight outfit Zalaegerszeg.

External links
PrvaLiga profile 

1988 births
Living people
Sportspeople from Čakovec
Association football midfielders
Croatian footballers
NK Varaždin players
NK Međimurje players
NK Nafta Lendava players
NK Maribor players
NK Hrvatski Dragovoljac players
NK Osijek players
Santarcangelo Calcio players
Zalaegerszegi TE players
Croatian Football League players
Slovenian PrvaLiga players
First Football League (Croatia) players
Serie C players
Nemzeti Bajnokság II players
Nemzeti Bajnokság I players
Croatian expatriate footballers
Expatriate footballers in Slovenia
Croatian expatriate sportspeople in Slovenia
Expatriate footballers in Italy
Croatian expatriate sportspeople in Italy
Expatriate footballers in Hungary
Croatian expatriate sportspeople in Hungary